The 2019 LFF I Lyga was the 30th season of the I Lyga, the second tier association football league of Lithuania. The season began on 22 March 2019 and finished in 27 October 2019.

Licensing process 
The Lithuanian Football Federation initially granted applications for 2019 LFF I Lyga licenses: 
FK Banga Gargždai, FK Nevėžis, FC Pakruojis, FC Džiugas, Žalgiris B, Stumbras B, Riteriai B (Trakai B).

After the appeal, on 28 February 2019 Lithuanian Football Federation granted licenses to 
FK Vilnius (Baltijos Futbolo Akademija), FK Minija Kretinga, DFK Dainava, Vilniaus Vytis, FK Atmosfera (2012), FC Hegelmann Litauen.

The final decision on the number of teams in 2019 LFF I Lyga was made by the Lithuanian Football Federation executive committee meeting on 15 March 2019. Exceptions were applied to FK Jonava (financial criteria were not met), FC Kupiškis (sporting criteria were not met) and FA Šiauliai (legal criteria were not met) and the teams were allowed to start in the 2019 LFF I Lyga championship, pending criteria to be met by June. The 16 team championship started on 22 March 2019.

The applications for the 2019 LFF I Lyga licenses were also received from FK Sveikata Kybartai, FM Ateitis and FK NFA but licenses were not granted. FK Utenis Utena shareholders voted to withdraw from participation in 2019 LFF I Lyga, and the club will participate in 2019 LFF II Lyga. FK Koralas Klaipėda was dissolved in 2018.

Participants

Final standings 
After FC Stumbras ran into financial difficulties in June the Lithuania Football Federation made a decision to withdraw their license from A lyga, and Stumbras B from I lyga.

FC Džiugas Telšiai earned promotion to A lyga, subject to meeting licensing criteria. FK Banga Gargždai earned a play-off with A lyga 7th placed FK Palanga.

Top scorers

References

I Lyga seasons
2019 in Lithuanian football
Lith
Lith